Rionansa is a municipality located in the autonomous community of Cantabria, Spain.

Geography 
This municipality is located in the Nansa River Valley, from which it takes its name, in western Cantabria. The territory is close to one hundred and twenty square miles, all of them belonging to the National Game Reserve Saja.

Localities 

 Arenas
 Las Bárcenas
 Cabrojo
 Celis
 Celucos
 Cosío
 La Cotera
 La Herrería
 Obeso
 Pedreo
 Los Picayos
 Puentenansa (Capital)
 Riclones
 Rioseco
 Rozadío
 San Sebastián de Garabandal

References

Municipalities in Cantabria